The following is a list of the governors of Rivers State. This list also contains administrators etc., during the era of Nigeria military juntas. Rivers State was created in 1967 with the split of the Eastern Region of Nigeria.

Elected governors (1979–83, 1992–93 and 1999–present)

By time in office

Military governors (1967–79, 1984–92 and 1993–99)

See also

Rivers State gubernatorial election, 2015
List of people from Rivers State

References

Rivers
Governors